Laura Sánchez Rodríguez (born May 5, 1972) is a retired female freestyle swimmer from Mexico. She represented her native country at the 1992 Summer Olympics in Barcelona, Spain. Her best result there was the 17th place (4:26.73) in the Women's 4 × 100 m Medley Relay event, alongside Heike Koerner (backstroke), Ana Mendoza (breaststroke), and Gabriela Gaja (butterfly).

References
 sports-reference

External links

1972 births
Living people
Mexican female medley swimmers
Mexican female freestyle swimmers
Swimmers at the 1991 Pan American Games
Swimmers at the 1992 Summer Olympics
Olympic swimmers of Mexico
Pan American Games bronze medalists for Mexico
Pan American Games medalists in swimming
Central American and Caribbean Games gold medalists for Mexico
Central American and Caribbean Games medalists in swimming
Competitors at the 1990 Central American and Caribbean Games
Medalists at the 1991 Pan American Games
20th-century Mexican women
21st-century Mexican women